Remote Sensing of Environment is an academic journal of remote sensing published by Elsevier. The journal was established in 1969 by Elsevier. Its editors-in-chief are Jing. M. Chen, Menghua Wang, and Marie Weiss.

It has three companion journals: Science of Remote Sensing, Remote Sensing Applications: Society and Environment, and the International Journal of Applied Earth Observation and Geoinformation.

Abstracting and indexing
The journal is indexed and abstracted in the following bibliographic databases:

According to Journal Citation Reports, its 2019 impact factor is 9.085.

References

External links

Remote sensing journals
Elsevier academic journals
Publications established in 1969
Journals published between 13 and 25 times per year